Bertha, the Sewing Machine Girl is a 1926 American drama film directed by Irving Cummings and written by Gertrude Orr. It is based on the 1906 play Bertha, the Sewing Machine Girl by Theodore Kremer. The film stars Madge Bellamy, Allan Simpson, Sally Phipps, Paul Nicholson, Anita Garvin and J. Farrell MacDonald. The film was released on December 19, 1926, by Fox Film Corporation.

Cast          
Madge Bellamy as Bertha Sloan
Allan Simpson as Roy Davis
Sally Phipps as Jessie
Paul Nicholson as Jules Morton
Anita Garvin as Flo Mason
J. Farrell MacDonald as Sloan
Ethel Wales as Mrs. Sloan
Arthur Housman as Salesman
Harry A. Bailey as Sam Ginsberg

References

External links
 

1926 films
Silent American drama films
1926 drama films
Fox Film films
Films directed by Irving Cummings
American silent feature films
American black-and-white films
1920s American films